Daryl Albert Dixon (born 26 June 1942 in Bundaberg, Queensland) is an Australian economic and investment writer and consultant. Presently the Executive Chairman of Dixon Advisory and Superannuation Services, he writes regular columns on personal investing, economic commentary and self managed superannuation in The Canberra Times, Australian Financial Review, The Australian and the former Smart Investor magazine.

Education
He attended Bundaberg State High School and Queensland University graduating in economics, and at Cambridge University on a Shell Postgraduate Scholarship to Clare College gaining a further degree with First Class Honours.

Career
Two years as Associate Professor of Economics at the University of Calgary, Canada and then lecturing in Economics at the Australian National University (ANU).  He was seconded from the ANU to the Department of the Treasury (6 months), then three years with the International Monetary Fund (IMF) in Washington DC focusing on taxation issues in Thailand, Kenya, Barbados and Swaziland all resulting in detailed reports.

As a consultant to Treasury he worked on a Taxation Review and in various public service positions in taxation and public finance. Key roles included Research Director of the Committee of Inquiry into Inflation and Taxation (chaired by Professor Russell Mathews)  and assisting Professor Trevor Swan with the Review of the personal income tax system for the 1975–76 Hayden Budget.

From 1978 until 1986, he was Policy Co-ordinator for the Social Welfare Policy Secretariat and continued as Head of this Policy Co-ordination Unit. Significant policy papers and reports include Alternative strategies to meet the income needs of the aged and Tax credits and reform of the tax and social security systems.

From 1986, he has been an independent writer and consultant. He has worked for the Australian Commission for the Future comparing the savings policies of Australia and Singapore.

Daryl also worked as a consultant to the Social Welfare Policy branch of the Brotherhood of St Laurence producing significant published discussion papers including The way ahead in fiscal policy.

In 1986 Daryl began writing the many newspaper articles and published books on personal investment, taxation and superannuation for which he became widely known in Australia.

In 1986 Daryl started Dixon Advisory, then Daryl Dixon Writer and Consultant.

In 2007 there was a playful reference in The Canberra Times newspaper to his understanding of superannuation in Australia which claimed that there were only three people who really understood super in Australia – "one is dead, one went mad and the other is Daryl Dixon". (A play on words from Lord Palmerston who is reported to have said: “Only three people have ever really understood the Schleswig-Holstein business—the Prince Consort, who is dead, a German professor, who has gone mad, and I, who have forgotten all about it.")

In 2012, The Strategic Super Investor magazine made Daryl the subject of their annual in Focus profile.

Daryl Dixon continues to write for the Australian press on economic, superannuation and investment issues.

Publications
Books include:

Journal and magazine articles include:

Newspaper articles include:

Sydney Morning Herald supplement on the 1998 Mini-Budget, Labor's strategy opens way for flat tax system, Tax reform on the cheap and Mortgage-holder the losers, (13 April 1989), Sydney Morning Herald, p. 2s

References

External links
  – Dixon Advisory
 ABC Nightlife – Tony Delroy interview with Daryl Dixon 27 November 2012 
 Sydney Morning Herald article – Choir of Clare College 2012 Australian Tour and Daryl Dixon

1942 births
Living people
Australian businesspeople
Superannuation in Australia
University of Queensland alumni
Alumni of Clare College, Cambridge
Academic staff of the University of Calgary
Academic staff of the Australian National University